This is a list of mosques in Libya.

List of mosques

See also
 Islam in Libya
 Lists of mosques

References

External links

 
Libya
Mosques